is a Japanese footballer who plays for Veertien Mie from 2023.

Career 
On 25 January 2019, Anzai left Kashiwa Reysol after eight years in the team, and joined the reserve team of SC Braga, signing in a two and a half-year contract. In 2020, Anzai joined Vilaverdense FC, who plays on the fourth tier Portugal, for the 2020–21 season.

After a brief two-year career at Portugal, he announced his return to Japan on 24 March 2022, as he joined Kantō Soccer League (of JRL) club Vonds Ichihara. On 16 December at same year, Anzai departed from the club after just a single season, due to contract expiration. Five days later, he was announced as a new signing for JFL club Veertien Mie for the upcoming 2023 season.

Career statistics 

Updated to the end 2022 season.

Club

References

External links

Profile at Kashiwa Reysol
Profile at Montedio Yamagata

1998 births
Living people
Association football people from Saitama Prefecture
Japanese footballers
J1 League players
J2 League players
Japan Football League players
Kashiwa Reysol players
Montedio Yamagata players
S.C. Braga B players
Vonds Ichihara players
Veertien Mie players
Association football midfielders